Oheka II was a private motor yacht built for German-born American investment banker Otto Hermann Kahn by Lürssen in 1927. Capable of 34 knots top speed, she became the blueprint for the Kriegsmarine's Schnellboot.

"Oheka" is an acronym of letters from Kahn's full name, Otto Herman Kahn. He had previously named his New York estate, built on Long Island between 1914 and 1919, Oheka.

Oheka II
Born in 1867 in Mannheim and relocated to the United States in 1893, Otto Hermann Kahn was an American-based investment banker, collector, philanthropist, and patron of the arts.

Kahn approached German boatbuilder Lürssen in 1926 to build a high-speed motor launch capable of use on holidays upon both the River Rhine and the North Sea.

German boat builders at the time were used to building sleek displacement hull cruising boats for the Rhine, which to create a smooth ride were round bottomed. However, the problem this creates is a greater depth in the water, and a resultant increase in hydro-dynamic drag, reducing speed. While on a river, this was not of concern, in a high-speed launch it would require more power.

The initial design choice of Lürssen for Kahn's yacht was for a round bottomed hull, to create a smooth ride and would in turn  reduce hydrodynamic drag, they reduced hull weight by forming a composite shell of wooden planks over an alloy metal frame. Finally, to counter the inefficient tendency of round hulls to "squat" stern-down in the water at high speeds, they counterbalanced it by two measures:

a hull form that flattened towards the stern, providing hydrodynamic lift where it was needed
forward positioning the engines, to counterbalance the stern drop

The result was a  semi-displacement hull displacing 22 tons, which was wider at the front than the rear, creating an almost perfect high-speed hydrodynamic shape. Having perfected the hull, Lürssen equipped the boat with three Maybach VL II V12 engines of  each.

There is no basis for the common misconception that Oheka II was a "rum runner" used for smuggling.

Schnellboot

In November 1929, Lürssen was given a contract to build a boat to the same basic design as Oheka II, but all metal with two torpedo tubes on the forecastle, and a slightly improved top speed. It became S-1, the Kriegsmarine's first Schnellboot and the basis for all the other S-Boats built during World War 2.

See also
Otto Hermann Kahn
Oheka Castle

References

External links
Oheka II @ Die yacht magazine 
 

Motor yachts
Ships built in Bremen (state)
1927 ships